The Zebulon B. Vance Birthplace is a historic site located in Weaverville, Buncombe County, North Carolina, United States.  The site is owned and operated by the North Carolina Division of State Historic Sites.

The site is located in the Reems Creek Valley, and was originally a mountain plantation.  The historic site explores daily life in the early 1800s in the Blue Ridge Mountains. Visitors can see the historic structures, including a loom house, tool shed, spring house, smoke house, and corn crib.  Guided tours show visitors a 1790 slave house and discuss the eighteen enslaved people that lived and worked on the Vance farm. Tours conclude at the reconstructed 1790s Vance home.

Zebulon Baird Vance was born on the property in 1830, and went on to be Governor of North Carolina (18771879) and U.S. Senator (18791894).

The farm features an exhibit about Vance's career, and how this early mountain life influenced him.

References
 
 , NCHR 30
 
 
 
 Travel and Promotion Division, Department of Conservation and Development. "Sheltering a heritage: North Carolina's historic buildings."  Raleigh, N. C." Litho Industries, Inc. 1969. http://digital.ncdcr.gov/u?/p249901coll22,642128 (accessed August 28, 2012).
 

Museums in Buncombe County, North Carolina
Historic house museums in North Carolina
North Carolina State Historic Sites
Protected areas of Buncombe County, North Carolina
Houses in Buncombe County, North Carolina
Vance, Zebulon B
Slave cabins and quarters in the United States
Plantation houses in North Carolina